The 1988 Virginia Slims of New England Women's single tennis tournament was won by Martina Navratilova. Pam Shriver was the defending champion but lost in the second round.

Navratilova won in the final 6–7, 6–4, 6–3 against Zvereva.

Seeds
A champion seed is indicated in bold text while text in italics indicates the round in which that seed was eliminated.

  Martina Navratilova (champion)
  Chris Evert (semifinals)
  Gabriela Sabatini (semifinals)
  Pam Shriver (second round)
  Helena Suková (quarterfinals)
  Natasha Zvereva (final)
  Barbara Potter (quarterfinals)
  Larisa Savchenko (second round)

Draw

References
 1988 Virginia Slims of New England Draw

Virginia Slims of New England
1988 WTA Tour